Maria Palaiologina was the Queen consort of Stephen Uroš III Dečanski of Serbia (1324–1331). She was the daughter of panhypersebastos John Palaiologos, and great-niece of Emperor Andronikos II Palaiologos (r. 1282–1328). Her maternal grandfather was megas logothetēs Theodore Metochites.

Her father was the governor of Thessaloniki in the early 1320s. Stephen Uroš III had earlier been married to Theodora of Bulgaria, but the marriage ended in with Theodora's death on 20 December 1322. Uroš III then married Maria in 1324. The royal couple's marriage lasted until her husband's death. Stephen Uroš III was defeated by his son Stephen Uroš IV Dušan (from the marriage with Theodora) in 1331, and shortly thereafter died in Zvečan (1332).

The relation between the father and son had been bad, the usurpation was incited by the "younger" nobility. Maria tried to assert the throne for her son Simeon Uroš, through Byzantine aid, but this was unsuccessful. Dušan the Mighty did not harm their family, Maria took monastic vows as Marta, and in 1348, Simeon became a governor of the southern provinces of the Serbian Empire. Maria died on April 7, 1355, and was buried in Skopje. A brief account of her turbulent life inscribed on her gravestone is attributed to her.

Family 
She had one son and two daughters by her marriage with Stephen Uroš III:
 Simeon Uroš, rival Emperor of Serbs and Greeks in the southern half of the Serbian Empire (r. 1359 - 1370)
 Jelena, married Duke Mladen III Šubić of Bribir (r. 1315 - 1348)
 Teodora, married Despot Dejan of Kumanovo (fl. 1355)

Ancestry

See also 
Nemanjić dynasty

References

Sources
 

14th-century Serbian royalty
Greek women of the Byzantine Empire
Palaiologos dynasty
Nemanjić dynasty
Medieval Serbian people of Greek descent
Medieval Serbian royal consorts
14th-century Serbian nuns
14th-century Byzantine nuns
Year of birth unknown